Medical Science Educator is a peer-reviewed journal that focuses on teaching the sciences that are fundamental to modern medicine and health. Coverage includes basic science education, clinical teaching and the incorporation of modern educational technologies. MSE offers all who teach in healthcare the most current information to succeed in their task by publishing scholarly activities, opinions, and resources in medical science education. MSE provides the readership a better understanding of teaching and learning techniques in order to advance medical science education. It is the official publication of the International Association of Medical Science Educators (IAMSE).

References

External links 
 International Association of Medical Science Educators (IAMSE)
 PubMed Journal Info Page

Publications established in 2007
English-language journals
Medical education
Science education journals
Quarterly journals
Springer Science+Business Media academic journals